The gunboat Opyt (: experience) was the first ironclad warship commissioned by the Imperial Russian Navy. It was built by Carr and MacPherson at the Baltic shipyard in Saint Petersburg.  English and Russian wrought iron plates 1200 x 1000 mm in size protected the front part of the gunboat.

Notes

References 
 
 Russian Torpedo Gunboats

Ships of the Imperial Russian Navy
Gunboats of the Imperial Russian Navy
1861 ships
Ships built at the Baltic Shipyard